Code Switch is a race and culture outlet and a weekly podcast from American public radio network NPR. It began in 2013 with a blog as well as contributing stories to NPR radio programs. The Code Switch podcast launched in 2016. In the wake of the George Floyd protests, it became one of NPR's top ranked podcasts.

History

Code Switch was launched in 2013 with a $1.5 million grant from the Corporation for Public Broadcasting; it developed as a blog and contributed stories to a variety of NPR programs. Harvard's Neiman Lab describes the project as "designed to increase coverage of race issues and reach out to new audiences" at NPR and affiliated media outlets.

The blog began publishing on April 7, 2013, with Gene Demby's introductory essay "How Code-Switching Explains The World".

The outlet's name refers to the linguistic phenomenon of code-switching, when speaker moves between multiple languages or dialectics. Demby's introductory essay said the project construed the concept broadly, with the linguistic concept also serving as means of analyzing aspects of race and culture in identity: "Many of us subtly, reflexively change the way we express ourselves all the time. We're hop-scotching between different cultural and linguistic spaces and different parts of our own identities—sometimes within a single interaction."

Content
Harvard's Neiman Lab described the Code Switch project as a "forward-thinking effort given the rapidly changing demographics in the U.S.[;] Code Switch has grown into a place where reporters tries to consider issues around race with nuance, whether that's the myth of the colorblind millennial, or going deep on the hit Broadway musical Hamilton." The outlet has also drawn notice for reporting and commentary on topics ranging from sports and reality television, to the Supreme Court.

Code Switch reporter Kat Chow has also described the project as especially interested in the "second beat" of a story: "If there is breaking news, we want to take a step back and see what this actually means. What is there to report on that hasn't already been said?"

Staff
Team members have included Gene Demby, who is lead blogger and cohosts the podcast with reporter Shereen Marisol Meraji; Tasneem Raja, senior digital editor; supervising senior producer Alicia Montgomery; Matt Thompson and Kat Chow.

Podcast
In May 2016, the Code Switch team launched a podcast by the same name. Episodes are released weekly on Wednesdays.

The Guardian characterized the podcast as "courageous conversations." Wired said Code Switch'''s July 14, 2016, episode "Black and Blue" offered "thoughtful conversation about race and policing." Los Angeles Magazine said, "NPR's 'Code Switch' began as a popular blog, but its evolution into a podcast seems natural...it explores issues of race, culture, and politics in a personal way that flourishes in an audio format." 

Awards and reception
 Code Switch won the Online News Association for best online commentary at a large outlet in 2014.

In 2015, the National Association of Hispanic Journalists awarded Shereen Marisol Meraji the "Radio, Feature News – Large Market" award for her Code Switch segment "Tandas".

Despite generally positive reaction to the blog, some users complain about practices and policies on moderating comments.

In 2016 Los Angeles Magazine recommended the Code Switch podcast as one of "5 Podcasts You Must Listen to This Summer".

In December 2020, Apple Podcasts announced that Code Switch had been selected as 'show of the year', marking the first time that Apple Podcasts'' recognized a single podcast of the year.

In 2021 the show won an Ambies award for "Best Society and Culture Podcast".

See also
 Public broadcasting
 Race and ethnicity in the United States
Political podcast

References

External links

NPR programs
2016 podcast debuts
Works about racism
Educational podcasts
Interview podcasts
Works about American history
Works about activism
Works about American politics
Works about social class
Works about race and ethnicity
Audio podcasts
Political podcasts
American podcasts